William Simmonds (5 May 1892 – 11 March 1957) was an English cricketer. He played two matches for Gloucestershire between 1924 and 1925.

References

External links

1892 births
1957 deaths
English cricketers
Gloucestershire cricketers
Cricketers from Bristol